Christos Moustogiannis  (born 1 March 1983) is a Greek footballer who plays as a midfielder for Fostiras in the Football League.

Career
Moustogiannis previously played for Egaleo in the Greek Super League and Kerkyra in the Beta Ethniki.

References

External links
 
Myplayer Profile

1983 births
Living people
Egaleo F.C. players
Acharnaikos F.C. players
A.O. Kerkyra players
Thrasyvoulos F.C. players
A.O. Glyfada players
Aiolikos F.C. players
Super League Greece players
Football League (Greece) players
Association football midfielders
Footballers from Athens
Greek footballers